Gyrineum aculeatum, the spined maple leaf, is a species of predatory sea snail, a marine gastropod mollusc in the family Cymatiidae.

Description
The size of the shell varies between 25 mm and 60 mm.

Distribution
This marine species occurs from Japan to Northwest Australia.

References

Cymatiidae
Gastropods described in 1909